Cosara or Kosara was a town of ancient Lycia, that appears on the Stadiasmus Patarensis.

Its site is unlocated, but it is likely in eastern Lycia north of Kitanaura.

References

Populated places in ancient Lycia
Former populated places in Turkey
Lost ancient cities and towns